Bob Maesen (born 24 May 1976) is a Belgian sprint canoer who has competed since the late 1990s. He won a silver medal in the K-2 1000 m event at the 2003 ICF Canoe Sprint World Championships in Gainesville.

Maesen also competed in three Summer Olympics, earning his best finish of fifth in the K-2 1000 m event at Athens in 2004.

References

Sports-reference.com profile
Yahoo! Sports

1976 births
Belgian male canoeists
Canoeists at the 2000 Summer Olympics
Canoeists at the 2004 Summer Olympics
Canoeists at the 2008 Summer Olympics
Living people
Olympic canoeists of Belgium
ICF Canoe Sprint World Championships medalists in kayak